"Marie" is a song, originally recorded by Cat Mother and the All Night Newsboys on their 1969 album The Street Giveth... And The Street Taketh Away. In the same year it was released on the B-side of the single "Can You Dance to It?".

Soon it was adapted into French (under the title "C'est la vie, Lily") by Pierre Delanoë. The French version was released in 1970 by Joe Dassin.

Background and writing 
The original was produced by Jimi Hendrix and Cat Mother.

Commercial performance 
According to the charts, courtesy of the Centre d'Information et de Documentation du Disque, that U.S. Billboard published in its "Hits of the World" section), the song "C'est la vie Lily" by Joe Dassin reached at least the top 6 in France (in the national [i.e. domestic] singles chart).

Track listings

Joe Dassin version 
7" single "C'est la vie, Lily / Billy Le Bordelais" CBS 4736
A. "C'est la vie, Lily" (3:03)
B. "Billy le Bordelais" (4:02)

See also 
 List of number-one singles of 1970 (France)

References

External links 
 Joe Dassin – "C'est la vie, Lily / Billy le Bordelais" (single) at Discogs

1969 songs
1970 singles
Cat Mother & the All Night Newsboys songs
Joe Dassin songs
Polydor Records singles
CBS Disques singles
Songs written by Pierre Delanoë
Song articles with missing songwriters